WSHW, "Shine 99" is an FM radio station owned by Kaspar Broadcasting (DBA Kaspar Media Group) in Frankfort, Indiana.  The station operates on the FM radio frequency of 99.7 MHz.  The station has an office and studio in Kokomo and Frankfort.  Shine 99 serves a 14 county area from its tower and transmitter located near the Howard, Clinton, Carroll County line.
WSHW Shine 99 1mv/meter coverage area includes all or parts of 14 counties in North-Central Indiana including Howard, Tippecanoe, Clinton, Cass, Boone, Carroll, Tipton, White, Miami, Hamilton, Montgomery, Wabash, Grant, Madison.

During the summer of 2015, the station flipped its music format to Contemporary Hit Radio (CHR) after spending several years evolving from its original adult contemporary music (AC) sound to a brighter, more contemporary music mix. It has operated under the "Shine 99" moniker and WSHW call letters since April 9, 1982.

WSHW was the first station in Indiana and second FM radio station in the United States to broadcast in HD 24/7 during HD's development phase. Shine 99 was one of the first radio stations in Indiana to have a web presence on the internet with a Shine Radio web site created during the summer of 1995.  Sister station WILO was the first AM station in the U.S. to broadcast an HD signal 24/7. WSHW also worked with Delphi Delco during the development phase of RDS (Radio Data System) which is now commonplace on most radio dash systems.

WSHW played a key role as an experimental station in the early development of RDS, bringing text to the car dashboard.

External links
Kaspar Broadcasting Corporate

References

SHW-FM
Contemporary hit radio stations in the United States